Edwin Ernesto Sánchez Vigil (born February 21, 1990 in Santa Tecla, El Salvador) is a Salvadoran professional footballer who plays as a midfielder.

Club career

Turín FESA FC
Sánchez started his career at Turín FESA before a stint in Argentinian youth football with Defensa y Justicia.

Santa Tecla FC
He returned to El Salvador to play for Segunda División club Santa Tecla, and made his debut in the Primera División de Fútbol de El Salvador with UES a year later.

Isidro Metapán
Sánchez signed with Isidro Metapán for the Apertura 2011. With Isidro Metapán, Sánchez reached the final of that tournament, defeating Once Municipal 1–0. Sánchez was a substitute in that final.

FAS
Sánchez signed with FAS in 2012.

Return to Santa Tecla FC
Sánchez signed again with Santa Tecla for the Clausura 2014.

Águila
Sánchez signed with Águila for the Apertura 2017.

In December 2018, Sanchéz's contract was not renewed by Águila.

International career
Sánchez made his debut for El Salvador in an October 2010 friendly match against Panama. He was called up by José Luis Rugamas to train with the senior team in preparation for the 2011 Central American Cup in January 2010.

He has represented his country in 6 FIFA World Cup qualification matches, was successfully able to participate in the 2011 Copa Centroamericana and was a non-playing squad member at the 2011 CONCACAF Gold Cup. He scored his first goal in a 2–1 win against Venezuela.

International goals
Scores and results list El Salvador's goal tally first.

Honours

A.D. Isidro Metapán
Primera División de Fútbol de El Salvador: (1) Apertura 2011

References

External links
 Edwin Sánchez at Soccerway 

1990 births
Living people
People from La Libertad Department (El Salvador)
Association football midfielders
Salvadoran footballers
El Salvador international footballers
2011 Copa Centroamericana players
2011 CONCACAF Gold Cup players
2017 CONCACAF Gold Cup players
A.D. Isidro Metapán footballers
Defensa y Justicia footballers
Santa Tecla F.C. footballers
C.D. FAS footballers